Breakthrough, also released as Steiner - Das Eiserne Kreuz, 2 and Sergeant Steiner is a 1979 war film set on the Western Front, specifically the Normandy coastline. The picture is a sequel to Sam Peckinpah's Cross of Iron, and includes several characters from that film.

The film starred several big names including Richard Burton, Robert Mitchum and Rod Steiger. Burton (Sergeant Steiner) and Helmut Griem (Major Stransky) assume the roles played by James Coburn and Maximilian Schell respectively in the original film. The supporting cast features Michael Parks and Curd Jürgens. Klaus Löwitsch is the only actor from Cross of Iron to reprise his role.

Plot
Starting in late May 1944, during the German retreat on the Eastern Front, Captain Stransky (Helmut Griem) orders Sergeant Steiner (Richard Burton) to blow up a railway tunnel to prevent Russian forces from using it. Steiner's platoon fails in its mission after coming up against a Russian tank. He then takes a furlough to Paris just as the Allies launch their invasion of Normandy.

Steiner's unit is transferred to France, occupying the village of St Bologne. General Hoffman (Curd Jürgens) orders Steiner to cross into nearby enemy territory and confer with American Colonel Rogers (Robert Mitchum) and General Webster (Rod Steiger), informing him that the High Command of the German Army (Wehrmacht) is plotting to assassinate Hitler and would like to surrender. The plan fails and American forces launch an attack on German forces in St Bologne where Stransky has planned an explosion to destroy both the Americans and the civilian inhabitants.

Steiner clearly sympathises more with the Americans, even to the extent of killing his fellow soldiers.

Cast
Richard Burton as Sergeant Rolf Steiner
Robert Mitchum as Colonel Rogers
Rod Steiger as General Webster
Michael Parks as Sergeant Anderson
Curd Jürgens as General Hoffmann
Helmut Griem as Major von Stransky
Klaus Löwitsch as Corporal Krüger
Christoph Waltz as Paramedic
Günter Meisner as SS Officer

Reception and criticism
Breakthrough was mostly financed by West German producers when it was released in 1979, after several changes were made to the sequel: for instance, the action was relocated from Russia to the Western Front and Richard Burton replaced Coburn as Sgt Steiner. The film was panned by critics, who identified a confusing plot, poor dialogue, an aged cast and undistinguished acting.

References

External links
 

1979 films
1970s war films
1970s English-language films
English-language German films
Films about the 20 July plot
Films directed by Andrew McLaglen
Films set in 1944
Films set in France
1970s German-language films
German war films
Western Front of World War II films
West German films
World War II films based on actual events
Constantin Film films
German World War II films
1970s German films